, also known as , was a Japanese film director, film actor, and screenwriter. He is well-regarded in Japan for his youth films but is best known abroad for Lady Snowblood and Lady Snowblood 2: Love Song of Vengeance, films not typical of his usual style.

Life and career
Fujita was born in Pyongyang, Korea. After graduating from Tokyo University, he joined the Nikkatsu studio in 1955. At Nikkatsu, he worked as a publicist, screenwriter, cinematographer and assistant director until he made his debut as a director in 1967. His first film, about a juvenile delinquent, Hikō shōnen: Hinode no sakebi, won him the 1967 New Directors Award from the Directors Guild of Japan. After a successful sequel, Hikō shōnen: Wakamono no toride , Fujita was tapped by Nikkatsu to direct two installments in their youth-oriented Alleycat Rock series which had been initiated in 1970 by director Yasuharu Hasebe with Alleycat Rock: Female Boss. Fujita's two episodes, Stray Cat Rock: Wild Jumbo and Alleycat Rock: Crazy Riders '71, both starred actress Meiko Kaji.

Fujita's August 1971 film for Nikkatsu, Wet Sand in August, a melodramatic look at disenchanted youth in a beach setting, was both a popular hit and a major critical success. Three months later Nikkatsu inaugurated their Roman porno era of big budget softcore pink films. Fujita stayed on with Nikkatsu and his two sequels to Wet Sand in August, the 1972 Scent of Eros in August and the 1973 Sweet Smell of Eros were both produced as part of the Roman porno line. Fujita, however, was able to forge a compromise with the sex and nudity demands of the Roman porno genre to bring these films, especially Sweet Smell of Eros, close to mainstream acceptance.

In the 1970s, Nikkatsu was still producing non-adult films as well as Roman porno and Fujita made a number of realistic dramas about youth and the generation gap including the 1973 Did the Red Bird Escape? (Akai tori nigeta) and two works from 1974, Virgin Blues and The Red Lantern, the latter film having been described as a young couple's "futile attempt to escape from a restrictive society." The two films for which Fujita is best known outside Japan, Lady Snowblood (1973) and its sequel Lady Snowblood 2: Love Song of Vengeance (1974), were produced by an independent company during a short hiatus from Nikkatsu. These violent action movies, quite different from Fujita's usual style, reunited him with Meiko Kaji, the star of his earlier Alleycat Rock films.

Fujita continued directing Roman porno films for Nikkatsu in the mid and late 1970s but the studio seldom interfered as long as the requisite nude scenes were provided and Fujita was able to produce works about relationships with a deft feel for characterization. He returned to his early roots in juvenile delinquent dramas with Female Delinquent: A Docu-Drama (1977) based on the autobiography of real life bad girl Mako Minato. His 1978 film Kaerazaru hibi told the story of a teenaged boy returning to his home town after the death of his father. In 1979 Fujita directed two films focusing on the problems of family life. So Soft, So Cunning, considered one of Fujita's best films, is "a somber look at family life in contemporary Japan", while Tenshi o yūwaku is a serious portrayal of the problems faced by a young couple (Momoe Yamaguchi and Tomokazu Miura) in the suburbs.

Fujita made only a few movies in the 1980s including the 1981 romantic drama Play It, Boogie-Woogie for Kadokawa Pictures. He returned to Nikkatsu for the 1983 film Double Bed about a disillusioned group of friends in their thirties and their illicit affairs. Fujita had also established himself as an actor with appearances in director Seijun Suzuki's 1980 film Zigeunerweisen and Juzo Itami's Tampopo (1985). In 1984 Fujita directed the crime thriller The Miracle of Joe Petrel and his last film as a director was Revolver, where a single gun connects the lives of several people.

Fujita continued his acting career up to the time of his death in August 1997 at age 65.

Awards
Toshiya Fujita was nominated twice for the Award of the Japanese Academy: in 1979 for Best Director and Best Screenplay for Kaerazaru hibi and 1981 as Best Supporting Actor for Zigeunerweisen. He also won the Readers' Choice Award given by Kinema Junpo in 1979 as Best Japanese Film Director for Kaerazaru hibi.

Filmography

Director
  (June 1967)
  (April 1970)
  (Aug. 1970)
  (Oct. 1970)
  (Jan. 1971)
  (Aug. 1971)
  (Aug. 1972)
  (Oct. 1972)
  (Feb. 1973)
  (Mar. 1973)
  (Dec. 1973)
  (Mar. 1974)
  (June 1974)
  (Aug. 1974)
  (Nov. 1974)
  (Dec. 1974)
  (Dec. 1975)
  (May 1977)
  (July 1977)
  (Mar. 1978)
 Kaerazaru hibi (Aug. 1978)
  (April 1979)
  (Aug. 1979)
  (Dec. 1979)
  (April 1981)
  (May 1982)
  (Aug. 1983)
 The Miracle of Joe Petrel (April 1984)
  (July 1986)
  (Oct. 1988)

Actor
 Zigeunerweisen (1980)
 Tampopo (1985)

References

External links
 
 

1932 births
1997 deaths
People from Pyongyang
University of Tokyo alumni
Pink film directors
Japanese male film actors
Samurai film directors
20th-century Japanese male actors
Japanese film directors
20th-century Japanese screenwriters